Malaysia faces several environmental issues. Malaysia's environment possesses megadiverse biological diversity, with globally significant endemism and biodiversity, but is threatened by several issues. Deforestation is a major issue in the country that has led to many species becoming threatened with extinction. As a major economic sector, palm oil production has had a substantial environmental impact. Air pollution is also a major issue, with the country one of the most affected countries by seasonal Southeast Asian haze. The country is also affected by climate change.

Issues

Climate change

Endangered species

Borneo pygmy elephant
Sumatran rhinoceros
Malayan tiger
Orangutan
Oriental darter
Storm's stork
Milky stork

Deforestation

The following are notable projects contributing to deforestation:
Hulu Terengganu Hydroelectric Project
Kelau Dam
Bukit Cherakah
Pulai River
Sungai Mas

Malaysia had a 2018 Forest Landscape Integrity Index mean score of 5.01/10, ranking it 111th globally out of 172 countries.

Pollution
Air pollution in Malaysia is a major issue, with the country one of the most affected by seasonal Southeast Asian haze.
 1982 Bukit Merah radioactive pollution
 2019 Kim Kim River toxic pollution

Reclamation

Coastal reclamation is damaging mangroves and turtle nesting sights.

Recycling and waste management 

The country has numerous waste and recycling policies and initiatives but overall low rate of recycling and problems with violations and enforcement of such laws and policies.

Water

Controversial projects and policies

Environmental organisations
Malaysian Nature Society
Global Environment Centre
Klima Action Malaysia

See also

Environment of Malaysia
Deforestation in Malaysia
Climate change in Malaysia
List of environmental issues

References

External links